Mithunam is a 1993 Indian Malayalam-language domestic drama film, directed by Priyadarshan and written by Sreenivasan. The film stars Mohanlal and Urvashi. It was produced by Mohanlal under the banner of Pranavam Arts and was distributed by Pranamam Pictures. The film features songs composed by M. G. Radhakrishnan and background score by S. P. Venkatesh.

Synopsis 
Sethumadhavan has plans to start a biscuit factory, Dakshayani Biscuits, named after his late mother. But the bureaucracy and the corruption of the officials are the hurdles in front of him. Along with that he has to solve the problems in his dysfunctional family, the fights between his brother and brother-in-law, other family problems.

He marries his long-term fiancée Sulochana, who always cribs that he does not have love towards her, which he had shown before their marriage. After a lot of comical incidents, Sethu establishes his factory and Sulochana realizes her mistakes and patches-up with Sethu, and head to Ooty to resume their honeymoon.

Cast

Mohanlal as Sethumadhavan aka Sethu
Urvashi as Sulochana, wife of Sethu
Sreenivasan as Preman, friend and assistant to Sethu
Jagathi Sreekumar as Head Constable Sugathan, brother-in-law of Sethu
Innocent as Lineman K. T. Kurup, elder brother of Sethu
Thikkurisi Sukumaran Nair as Kurup Master, father of Sethu
Sankaradi as Vishwanathan, Sethu's maternal uncle
C. I. Paul as Kannan, Chief Engineer
Janardanan as Sivaraman, Sulochana's elder brother 
Kuthiravattam Pappu as 'Palisha' Peethambaran
Nedumudi Venu as Cherkkonam Swamy
Meena as housemaid
Sukumari as Swamini Amma
Zeenath as Subhadra, K. T. Kurup's wife
K. R. Vatsala as Renuka, Sethu's elder sister and Sugathan's wife
Kuttyedathi Vilasini as Shyama's Kunjamma
Kozhikode Narayanan Nair as Kunjuraman, Village Officer
Usha as Shyama
Kanakalatha as Sivaraman's wife
Kaveri as Sulochana's younger sister
Nandhu as Raghu, Auto-rickshaw driver 
James as Pappi, Peethambaran's henchman
Vishal Menon as Rajesh, Sugathan's son

Production 

Major plot point in the film is when Sethumadhavan and Sulochana leaves for honeymoon with their entire family members. This incident was based on the honeymoon trip of actress Menaka and film producer G. Suresh Kumar. They went to Ooty for honeymoon, Suresh Kumar's brother and his wife and son were also in the car with them, director Vijayan, producer Sanal Kumar and P. Radhakrishnan joined them along the way. They reached the destination after midnight and slept together at servants' dormitory of a hotel as rooms were unavailable. Menaka and Suresh Kumar told this incident to Priyadarshan, who decided to include this in the film. Sabu Cyril served as the art director, while Kumar was the choreographer and Thyagarajan was the action director.

Soundtrack 
The songs in the movie was composed by M. G. Radhakrishnan and written by O. N. V. Kurup. The songs were distributed by Magna Sound. The background score for the movie was composed by S. P. Venkatesh.

In popular culture
In the 2014 film, Polytechnic, the name of the biscuit factory in Mithunam, Dakshayani Biscuits, was adapted for a defunct biscuit factory in the film, which the protagonist played by Kunchacko Boban buys. In the 2021 film Minnal Murali, a biscuit packet named as Dakshayani Biscuits is shown in a shot.

References

External links
 

1993 films
1990s Malayalam-language films
Indian comedy-drama films
Films with screenplays by Sreenivasan
Films shot in Kozhikode
Pranavam Arts International films
Films directed by Priyadarshan